The Tembe River is situated in the Maputo Province, Mozambique. Together with the rivers Matola, Umbuluzi, and Infulene, it forms the Estuário do Espírito Santo, where the capital Maputo is located, and the main port of the country, Port Maputo.

References

Rivers of Mozambique
Rivers of Eswatini